Estebán Gabriel Vizcarra (born 11 April 1986) is a professional footballer who plays as a winger or an attacking midfielder for Liga 1 club Madura United. Born in Argentina, he represented Indonesia at international level.

Club career 
Vizcarra previously played for Pelita Jaya, Spanish club CD Salobreña and in his native Argentina for Club Atlético Douglas Haig and Club Atlético Huracán.

On 3 November 2014, he signed for Semen Padang. In January 2019, Vizcarra joined Persib Bandung, signing a one-year contract with a renewal option.

International career 
Vizcarra made his debut for Indonesia on 10 October 2018 in a friendly against Myanmar.

Career statistics

Club

International

Honours

Club 
Semen Padang
Indonesia Premier League: 2011–12
Indonesian Community Shield: 2013

Arema
 Piala Presiden: 2017

Sriwijaya FC
 East Kalimantan Governor's Cup: 2018

References

External links 
 
 

1986 births
Living people
Indonesian footballers
Indonesia international footballers
Argentine footballers
Argentine emigrants to Indonesia
Indonesian people of Argentine descent
Sportspeople of Argentine descent
Argentine expatriate footballers
Primera Nacional players
Liga 1 (Indonesia) players
Expatriate footballers in Indonesia
Argentine expatriate sportspeople in Indonesia
Club Atlético Huracán footballers
Club Atlético Douglas Haig players
Pelita Jaya FC players
Pelita Bandung Raya players
Semen Padang F.C. players
Arema F.C. players
Sriwijaya F.C. players
Persib Bandung players
Madura United F.C. players
Association football midfielders
Naturalised citizens of Indonesia
Sportspeople from Buenos Aires Province